Grande-Terre (Maore or Nyambo Bole in Shimaore) is the main island of the French overseas region of Mayotte. The island is located in the northern Mozambique Channel in the Indian Ocean, namely between northwestern Madagascar and northeastern Mozambique.

History

References

Islands of Mayotte